Kuy Bolagh (also Romanized as Kūy Bolāgh) is a village in Pish Khowr Rural District, Pish Khowr District, Famenin County, Hamadan Province, Iran. At the 2006 census, its population was 24, in 9 families.

References 

Populated places in Famenin County